Mufti Muhammad Naeem (1958 – 20 June 2020) was a Pakistani cleric and Islamic scholar who served as Chancellor of Jamia Binoria.

Biography

Family background
His paternal family came from Surat in Indian Gujarat. His grandfather was born a Parsi who adopted Islam.

Life and career
Naeem was born in 1958. He also co-founded the Deobandi seminary Jamia Binoria.
He was executive member of Wifaq ul Madaris Al-Arabia, Pakistan.

Death and legacy
He died in Karachi on 20 June 2020 because of a heart attack. However Chief Minister Sindh Murad Ali Shah revealed in a speech at Sindh Assembly that Mufti Naeem, Talib Jauhri and Munawar Hasan, all of the three clerics who died in past week were due to COVID-19 during the COVID-19 pandemic in Pakistan.

His funeral prayer was led by Muhammad Taqi Usmani. The funeral was attended by scholars like  Muhammad Hanif Jalandhari, Hakeem Azhar of Ashraf ul Madaris, Taqi Usmani's son Muhammad Imran Ashraf Usmani of Jamia Darul Uloom, Karachi, Merajul Huda Siddiqui, Saeed Ahmad Afridi and his students. Prime Minister of Pakistan Imran Khan, President Arif Alvi, Governor of Sindh Imran Ismail and the Chief Minister of Sindh Syed Murad Ali Shah expressed sadness over his death.

He is survived by his wife, three sons and two daughters. Earlier in 2014, his son-in-law, Masood Beg, was killed in an attack in Karachi.

Voice of justice and anti-terrorism
Reportedly he played a significant role in shaping 'Paigham-e-Pakistan' – a historic fatwa against terrorism issued on 10 February 2016, at the end of a 'Paigham-e-Islam' conference attended by over five thousand Ulema, Mashaikh and Islamic scholars. Mufti Naeem had also spoken out against suicide bombings and rise of terrorism back in 2007.

References

1958 births
2020 deaths
Pakistani Islamic religious leaders
Pakistani Sunni Muslim scholars of Islam
Pakistani people of Gujarati descent
People of Parsi descent
Deaths from the COVID-19 pandemic in Sindh
Deobandis
Chancellors of the Jamia Binoria